Club Deportivo Colonia, usually known simply as Deportivo Colonia or Depor Colonia, is an Uruguayan football club based in Colonia.

Stadium
Their home field is Estadio Miguel Campomar, in Juan Lacaze.

History
They played in the Uruguayan Second Division after being relegated from the Uruguayan First Division in the 2005/2006 season. They have been disaffiliated from Asociación Uruguaya de Fútbol due to no payment of debts before the 2nd division start in 2007.

References

External links
Deportivo Colonia official site

Football clubs in Uruguay
Association football clubs established in 1999
1999 establishments in Uruguay
Sport in Colonia Department